Darshinis are quick and self service type of vegetarian restaurants in India. The term "Darshini  " was first used by an entrepreneur Janardhan Airodi. The concept of Darshini type restaurant model was conceived by R. Prabhakar in 1983 which is inspired from west. All the menu includes mostly South Indian breakfast dishes.

All darshinis are pay-first-eat-later. The main focus of Darshini model is to quickly serve quality local food for a low price.

The first Darshini named Cafe Darshini was started in Jayanagar, Bangalore in the year 1983 by R. Prabhakar

Recognition
A Darshini type restaurant model is so popular in city like Bengaluru that the city corporation has been issuing trade license as Darshini type hotel since mid-2000s.

See also 
 Udupi cuisine
 List of vegetarian restaurants

References 

Karnataka cuisine
Fast-food chains of India
Restaurants in Bangalore
Vegetarian restaurants in India